Orange Hills is a neighborhood located in the eastern portion of the City of Orange in Orange County, California. It is located between Anaheim Hills and Villa Park. Its general developments include single-family dwellings located in smaller subdivisions like Parkridge Estates, Serrano Heights, and Belmont Estates. It is part of the Orange Unified School District and Santiago Canyon College is nearby. Some people consider Orange Hills to only include the foothills within the 92867 ZIP code border, while others consider it to include the areas surrounding the unincorporated areas of Orange Park Acres as well, which are in the 92869 ZIP code.

Neighborhoods in Orange, California
Geography of Orange, California